The Free Art License (FAL), is a copyleft license that grants the right to freely copy, distribute, and transform creative works.

History
The license was written in July 2000 with contributions from the mailing list <copyleft_attitudeApril.org> and in particular with French lawyers Mélanie Clément-Fontaine and David Geraud, and French artists Isabelle Vodjdani and Antoine Moreau. It followed meetings held by Copyleft Attitude Antoine Moreau with the artists gathered around the magazine Allotopie: Francis Deck, Antonio Gallego, Roberto Martinez and Emma Gall. They took place at "Accès Local" in January 2000 and "Public" in March 2000, two places of contemporary art in Paris.

In 2003, Moreau organized a session at the EOF space which brought together hundreds of authors to achieve exposure according to the principles of copyleft with this condition: "Free Admission if free work". The Copyleft Attitude collective and the Free Art License).

In 2007, version 1.3 of the Free Art License was amended to provide greater legal certainty and optimum compatibility with other copyleft licenses.

Application 
Licence was inspired by FLOSS licences and issues related but not exclusive to digital arts: It was born out of the observation of the world of the free software and the Internet, but its applicability is not limited to the digital supports. It is recommended by the Free Software Foundation in the following terms: "We don't take the position that artistic or entertainment works must be free, but if you want to make one free, we recommend the Free Art License. "

Version 1.1 was adopted by art organizations like Constant (Brussels) and was translated to English by artists and technologist Antoine Schmitt.
Open Definition website of Open Knowledge Foundation lists FAL 1.2 and 1.3 as one of licences conformant with the principles set forth in the Open Definition.

Compatibility with CC BY-SA 4.0 
The Free Art License is equivalent to the Creative Commons Attribution-Share Alike (CC BY-SA) license.

On October 21, 2014, after public discussions, the Copyleft Attitude collective announced that the Free Art License is now legally compatible with the Creative Commons Attribution-ShareAlike 4.0 International (CC BY-SA 4.0) license. This decision is strongly welcomed by the Creative Commons organization, which has defended this compatibility from the beginning.

See also
 Share-alike

References

External links 

 The Free Art License;  
 Licence Art Libre;  
 Freemages : a library of photos under Free Art License 

Free content licenses
Business of visual arts
Free music
2000 introductions
French copyright law
Copyleft
Free and open-source software licenses
Copyleft software licenses